Blair Thomas Spittal (born 19 December 1995) is a Scottish footballer who plays as a midfielder for Motherwell. He has previously played for Queen's Park, Dundee United, Partick Thistle and Ross County.

Early life and career
Blair began playing for Erskine Boys Club and from there moved to Rangers. He spent two years there before joining Queen's Park's under-17 side. He attended Park Mains High School in Erskine.

Club career

Queen's Park
At the age of 16 years old, Blair made his debut for Queen's Park away to Montrose on 17 November 2012. He went on to make a total of 18 appearances that season, scoring his only goal in a 5–3 win away to Elgin.

The following season, he established himself as a first team regular, making 41 appearances and scoring 12 goals in the process. This successful form saw him pursued by both of Dundee's Scottish Premiership clubs. Having agreed terms with both sides, he opted to join his ex-Queen's Park teammates Aidan Connolly and Andrew Robertson at Dundee United, over city rivals Dundee.

Dundee United
Having spent the first two games of the season as an unused substitute, Blair made his debut for the Terrors from the bench in the club's third game of the season away to Celtic on 16 August 2014. Blair played in the United squad that faced relegation from the Premiership in 2016. He was part of the side that won the 2016–17 Scottish Challenge Cup as he played in the earlier third and fourth rounds, as well as the quarter-final. However, he missed out on both the semi-finals and the final due to injury.

Partick Thistle
Blair joined Scottish Premiership club Partick Thistle on a two-year contract on 15 June 2017. He scored three goals in his first three games for the club, scoring a brace against St Mirren in the Scottish League Cup, including a free kick. He then scored in a 2-1 win away to Airdrieonians in the same competition. Blair marked his league debut for Partick Thistle with 3 assists against Aberdeen in a 4-3 defeat. In his second league appearance for the club, he scored his first league goal away to Ross County in a 1–1 draw. Blair continued his form the week after with a goal direct from a free kick and another assist as ten-man Thistle grabbed a 2-2 draw with Rangers at Firhill, taking his overall club tally to 7 appearances, 5 goals and 4 assists in all competitions. He then carried his form into the next league game by opening the scoring in a 1–1 draw with Hearts. He scored his fourth league goal of the campaign with another freekick, scoring the opener in a 3-2 home win against Motherwell. On 26 February 2019, in the absence of Partick Thistle's regular club captain Stuart Bannigan, Blair donned on the armband as the club travelled to East End Park to take on Dunfermline. They ended up losing the game 3–0. Blair again lead the team out in a home game against Hearts in the Scottish Cup quarter-final which ended in a 1-1 draw, meaning that there would be a replay in Edinburgh. Blair rounded off the season with a total of 8 goals in all competitions, and was awarded the club's Player of the Year award. Blair informed the club that he intended to leave on 31 May 2019. In all competitions, he made 89 appearances for the Jags, scoring 15 goals and registering 13 assists.

Ross County
On 4 June 2019, Blair signed for Ross County, agreeing a two-year contract. He made his club debut in the Scottish League cup at home to Montrose, providing an assist. Three days later, he scored his first goal for the club in a 4-0 away win to Brechin City. Just five days on, he bagged another assist in a 2-1 away win against the group favourites St. Johnstone. Ross County would finish top of their league cup group with the maximum twelve points and advance to round two. Blair would start his first Premiership game on the bench, but was subbed on after just 11 minutes to help his side defeat Hamilton 3-0.

Return to Partick Thistle
On 7 October 2020, Blair made a return to former club Partick Thistle who, at the time, were in League One, on a loan deal until January. Blair scored on his second debut for Partick Thistle just hours after he rejoined the club, scoring the equaliser in an eventual 4-1 defeat away to St. Mirren in their Scottish League Cup group stage. Blair scored his first league goal in his second spell for Thistle, scoring the winner in a 2-1 home win over Airdrieonians in the second league game of the season, with a fantastic curled shot into the top corner from outside the box.
On 22 January 2021 Spittal was recalled to County following the suspension of the League one season.

Return to Ross County
Following his loan spell at Partick, Blair returned to Dingwall in January. From then and until the end of the season, he only made 5 appearances. Spittal became a first-team regular for the 2021-22 campaign and was given the number 7 shirt. On 17 May 2022 it was announced Spittal would leave Ross County at the end of his contract after 3 years having made 72 appearances for the club scoring 12 goals.

Motherwell
On 27 May 2022, it was announced that Spittal would join Motherwell on a two-year contract.

Career statistics

Honours

Club

Dundee United
Scottish Challenge Cup: 2016–17

Individual
PFA Scotland Scottish League Two Team of the Year: 2013–14

References

Living people
1995 births
Scottish footballers
Rangers F.C. players
Queen's Park F.C. players
Dundee United F.C. players
Partick Thistle F.C. players
Scottish Football League players
Scottish Professional Football League players
Association football midfielders
People from Erskine
Footballers from Renfrewshire
Ross County F.C. players
People educated at Park Mains High School
Motherwell F.C. players